Kin Sang Estate is a public housing estate in Tuen Mun, New Territories, Hong Kong. It is the eleventh public housing estate in Tuen Mun, located near Light Rail Kin Sang stop, Ching Chung Koon and Castle Peak Hospital. It consists of four residential buildings completed in 1989. In 1998, some of the flats were sold under Tenants Purchase Scheme Phase 1.

Siu Hin Court is a Home Ownership Scheme court in Tuen Mun, near Kin Sang Estate. It has two blocks built in 1991. The two blocks were originally planned for rental housing of Kin Sang Estate, but their flats were finally converted to HOS to be sold to public.

Houses

Kin Sang Estate

Siu Hin Court

Demographics
According to the 2016 by-census, Kin Sang Estate had a population of 7,876 while Siu Hin Court had a population of 2,928. Altogether the population amounts to 10,804.

Politics
Kin Sang Estate and Siu Hin Court are located in Kin Sang constituency of the Tuen Mun District Council. It was formerly represented by Law Pei-lee, who was elected in the 2019 elections until July 2021.

Education
Kin Sang Estate is in Primary One Admission (POA) School Net 70. Within the school net are multiple aided schools (operated independently but funded with government money) and the following government schools: Tuen Mun Government Primary School (屯門官立小學).

See also

Public housing estates in Tuen Mun

References

Residential buildings completed in 1989
Public housing estates in Hong Kong
Tenants Purchase Scheme
Tuen Mun
Tuen Mun District
1989 establishments in Hong Kong